Controversial Reddit communities are communities on the social news site Reddit (known as "subreddits"), often devoted to explicit, violent, or hateful material, that have been the topic of controversy. Controversial Reddit communities sometimes get significant media coverage.

History 
When Reddit was founded in 2005, there was only one shared space for all links, and subreddits did not exist. Subreddits were created later, but could only initially be created by Reddit administrators. In 2008, subreddit creation was opened to all users.

Reddit rose to infamy in October 2011, when a report by CNN showed that Reddit was harboring the r/jailbait community, which was devoted to sharing suggestive or revealing photos of underage girls. After commenters were seen asking for nude photos of underage girls, and under significant external scrutiny, Reddit shut down r/jailbait.

In 2012, the subreddit r/Creepshots received major backlash due to being a subreddit for sharing suggestive or revealing photos of women taken without their awareness or consent. Adrian Chen wrote a Gawker exposé of one of the subreddit's moderators and identified the person behind the account, starting discussion in the media about the ethics of anonymity and outing on the Internet.

Quarantining 

In 2015, Reddit introduced a quarantine policy to make visiting certain subreddits more difficult. Visiting or joining a quarantined subreddit requires bypassing a warning prompt. In addition, quarantined subreddits do not appear in non-subscription based (aggregate) feeds such as r/all in order to prevent accidental viewing, do not generate revenue, and their user count is not visible. Since 2018, subreddits are allowed to appeal their quarantine.

Misinformation 

Due to Reddit's decentralized moderation, user anonymity, and lack of fact-checking systems, the platform is highly prone to spreading misinformation and disinformation. Those who use Reddit should exercise caution in taking user-created unsourced content as fact. Reddit communities exhibit the echo chamber effect, in which repeated unsourced statements come to be accepted among the community as fact, leading to distorted worldviews among users.

Much attention has been focused to the issue of potentially harmful medical misinformation. A 2021 letter from the United States Senate to Reddit CEO Steve Huffman expressed concern about the spread of COVID-19 misinformation on the platform. Another example is a 2022 study revealing an abundance of unsourced and potentially harmful medical advice for urinary tract infections, such as suggesting fasting as a UTI cure.

Banned subreddits 

Banned subreddits refer to subreddits that Reddit has shut down indefinitely.

Beatingwomen 

On June 9, 2014, a subreddit called r/beatingwomen was closed by Reddit. The community, which featured graphic depictions of violence against women, was banned after its moderators were found to be sharing users' personal information online, and collaborating to protect one another from sitewide bans. Following the ban, the community's founder rebooted the subreddit under the name r/beatingwomen2 in an attempt to circumvent the ban, but was banned afterwards.

Braincels 

r/Braincels was the most popular subreddit for incels, or "involuntary celibates", after r/Incels (see below) was banned, gaining 16,900 followers by April 2018. The subreddit promoted rape and suicide. The subreddit was banned in 2019, after violating Reddit's content policy with respect to bullying and harassment.

ChapoTrapHouse 

r/ChapoTrapHouse was a subreddit dedicated to the leftist podcast Chapo Trap House which is associated with the term dirtbag left. The community had 160,000 regulars before being banned on June 29, 2020, because they "consistently host rule-breaking content and their mods have demonstrated no intention of reining in their community." Previously, the community had been quarantined for content that promotes violence. The community of the subreddit later migrated to an instance of Lemmy, a Reddit alternative.

The "Chimpire" 

The term "Chimpire" refers to a collection of subreddits and affiliated websites that promoted anti-black racism, including frequent use of racial slurs. In June 2013, the subreddit r/niggers was banned from Reddit for engaging in vote manipulation, incitements of violence, and using racist content to disrupt other communities. Reddit general manager Erik Martin noted that the subforum was given multiple chances to comply with site rules, noting that "users can tell from the amount of warnings we extended to a subreddit as clearly awful as r/niggers that we go into the decision to ban subreddits with a lot of scrutiny". Following the ban of r/niggers, the subreddit r/Coontown grew to become the most popular "Chimpire" site, with over 15,000 members at its peak. Many of the posters on these subreddits were formerly involved with r/niggers.

One of these subreddits, r/shitniggerssay, was banned in June 2015 at the same time as r/fatpeoplehate. In the midst of changes to Reddit's content policy, r/Coontown was banned in August 2015.

Chodi 

r/Chodi, whose name is derived from a crude Hindi sexual slang term, was a right-wing Indian subreddit that claimed to be a "free speech sub for memes, jokes, satire, sarcasm and fun". The sub, which had over 90,000 subscribers as of January 2022, frequently propagated Islamophobic, anti-Christian, homophobic, and misogynistic content, with open calls for genocide against Muslims. Time reports that users used intentional misspellings and slang to circumvent Reddit's anti-hate speech software. The Quint cited the subreddit's popularity as an example of how Reddit is used as a haven for hate speech in India. It was banned on March 23, 2022, for promoting hate, causing its users to move to Telegram.

ChongLangTV 

r/ChongLangTV, whose name is derived from the Great Wave off Kanagawa, was a Chinese-language subreddit that espoused extreme anti-Chinese sentiment. The sub, which had over 53,000 subscribers as of March 2022, was banned on March 2, 2022, for "exposing privacy of others." A participant of the subreddit told Radio Free Asia that the Reddit ban was due to Chinese long-arm internet censorship. Following the ban, the community's founder rebooted the subreddit under the name r/CLTV in an attempt to circumvent the ban, but was banned afterwards.

CreepShots 

A year after the closure of r/jailbait, another subreddit called r/CreepShots drew controversy in the press for hosting sexualized images of women without their knowledge. In the wake of this media attention, u/violentacrez was added to r/CreepShots as a moderator; reports emerged that Gawker reporter Adrian Chen was planning an exposé that would reveal the real-life identity of this user, who moderated dozens of controversial subreddits, as well as a few hundred general-interest communities. Several major subreddits banned links to Gawker in response to the impending exposé, and the account u/violentacrez was deleted. Moderators defended their decisions to block the site from these sections of Reddit on the basis that the impending report was "doxing" (a term for exposing the identity of a pseudonymous person), and that such exposure threatened the site's structural integrity.

When Chen informed u/violentacrez about the impending exposé, the user pleaded with Chen not to publish it, as he was concerned about the potential impact on his employment and finances, noting that his wife was disabled and he had a mortgage to pay. He also expressed concern that he would be falsely labeled a child pornographer or antisemite, due to some of the subreddits he had created. Despite u/violentacrez's offer to delete his postings and leave Reddit, Chen insisted he would still publish the piece.

Gawker exposé 

Chen published the piece on October 12, 2012, revealing that the person operating the u/violentacrez account was a middle-aged programmer from Arlington, Texas named Michael Brutsch. Within a day of the article being published, Brutsch was fired by his employer, and the link to the exposé was briefly banned from Reddit. He stated on Reddit after the article was published that he had received numerous death threats.

Reddit CEO Yishan Wong defended the content Brutsch contributed to the site as free speech, and criticized efforts to ban the Gawker link on the same basis. Wong stated that the staff had considered a site-wide ban on the link, but rejected this idea, for fear it would create a negative impression of the site without getting results. Brutsch later briefly returned to Reddit on a different account, and criticized what he stated were numerous factual inaccuracies in the Gawker exposé.

A week after the exposé, Brutsch held an interview with CNN that aired on Anderson Cooper 360°. In the interview with journalist Drew Griffin, Brutsch was apologetic about his activity on Reddit. He explained that he was most fond of the appreciation he got from other redditors, and that Reddit helped him relieve stress. Brutsch also described the support he had from administrators, stating that he had received an award for his contributions. Reddit noted that the award was for winning a community vote for "Worst Subreddit", and stated that they regretted sending it, as well as claiming the u/violentacrez account had been banned on several occasions. Brutsch subsequently noted on Reddit that he regretted doing the interview, and criticized the accuracy of the statement Reddit gave to CNN.

Chris Slowe, a lead programmer of Reddit until 2010, said of the relationship between Brutsch and the Reddit staff: "We just stayed out of there and let him do his thing and we knew at least he was getting rid of a lot of stuff that wasn't particularly legal."

Ethics of outing 

Gawker's outing of Brutsch as u/violentacrez led to contentious discussion about privacy and anonymity on the Internet. Such discussions included claims that outing, or "doxing", was necessary to draw attention to objectionable content so it could be removed, while others claimed that it impeded the ability for people to exercise their right to legal free speech online due to fear of public retribution.

Jude Doyle (at the time known as Sady Doyle), while writing for The Guardian, compared it to the outing of the alleged blackmailer of Amanda Todd, and suggested that such outings may be justified. He also stated that they may also unduly focus attention on individuals without confronting the underlying problems, by engaging in "sensationalism" at the expense of cultural reform. In PC Magazine, Damon Poeter stated that, while he has defended protecting anonymity on the Internet, he still supported Brutsch being outed, as he felt that the various subreddits he contributed to as u/violentacrez were serious invasions of privacy, regardless of legality, and that it was therefore justifiable to reveal his personal details.

The public outpouring of hostility towards Brutsch following the exposé prompted commentators such as Danah Boyd of Wired and Michelle Star of CNET to question the morality of outing as a way to enforce societal standards online. Several commentators have expressed concern that the public shaming of Brutsch to serve as an example to others is legitimizing Internet vigilantism, and exposing individuals such as Brutsch to mass retribution.

CringeAnarchy 

r/CringeAnarchy was a subreddit themed around "cringe" and "edgy", politically incorrect content. Originally an uncensored (hence "anarchy") spinoff of r/cringe, its content later shifted to the far right, with anti-transgender and anti-"SJW" content taking over. The subreddit was quarantined in September 2018, at which point it had over 400,000 subscribers.

Following the 2019 Christchurch mosque shootings, more anti-Muslim posts were made on the subreddit. The subreddit was banned on April 25, 2019, for violating Reddit's content policy regarding violent content.

DarkNetMarkets 

The subreddit r/DarkNetMarkets, a darknet market discussion forum, featured participation from their owners, causing US authorities to request personal information behind several accounts. This subreddit was banned on March 21, 2018.

Deepfakes 

Deepfakes was a controversial subreddit that superimposed famous female actresses onto pornographic videos, made using FakeApp, without the consent of the actresses. Such actresses included Emma Watson and Daisy Ridley. After the subreddit was given notoriety from the press, videos from the subreddit were banned from Gfycat and Discord. On February 7, 2018, the day after Pornhub banned the videos, the subreddit was banned as well.

European

r/European was a far-right white nationalist subreddit focused on news relating to Europe. Founded in 2013 in response to r/europe's ban on hate speech, its users often promoted anti-Semitic, Islamophobic, and racist content, with an informal survey showing that 17% of the userbase openly identified as Nazis. The sub was set to private by its moderators, which was then quarantined by the sitewide administrative staff, in 2016 in response to a post where a user bragged about assaulting a Muslim refugee. The users subsequently migrated to r/The_Donald, and then to r/Mr_Trump following dispute with the moderators. r/European was banned on March 12, 2018 for violating its content policies.

FatPeopleHate 

On June 10, 2015, Reddit banned five subreddits, citing an anti-harassment policy. The largest of the banned subreddits, r/fatpeoplehate, had an estimated 151,000 subscribers at the time of its banning. r/fatpeoplehate hosted photos of overweight people (mostly women) for the purpose of mockery. The other four subreddits were r/hamplanethatred, r/neofag, r/transfags, and r/shitniggerssay. A Reddit admin said, "We will ban subreddits that allow their communities to use the subreddit as a platform to harass individuals when moderators don't take action".

Following the ban, Reddit users flooded the site with pictures of overweight people, as well as photos of Reddit's interim CEO Ellen Pao. Due to the decision to ban these subreddits, some users moved to Voat, a social aggregation website similar to Reddit, although other fat-shaming forums continued to exist on Reddit at the time.

FindBostonBombers 

Following the 2013 Boston Marathon bombing, members of the subreddit r/findbostonbombers wrongly identified a number of people as suspects, including a 17-year-old track athlete and a 22-year-old  Brown University student missing since March. A body reported to be that of the missing Brown student misidentified as a Boston bomber suspect, who had been missing for a month before-hand, was found in Providence River in Rhode Island on April 25, 2013, as reported by the Rhode Island Health Department. The cause of death was found to be suicide. The subreddit was later made private.

Reddit general manager Erik Martin later issued an apology for this behavior, criticizing the "online witch hunts and dangerous speculation" that took place in these investigation-oriented communities. In September 2013, a similar subreddit dedicated to finding the Navy Yard shooter(s) was banned by the Reddit admins. These events were dramatized in TV shows The Newsroom and The Good Wife.

frenworld 

r/frenworld, whose title is derived from the alt-right meme "Clown World", attracted controversy over its use of Pepe the Frog edits and clown imagery to promote anti-Semitic and racist dog whistles. Examples found by The Times of Israel and The Daily Dot include numerous references to Holocaust denialism, the USS Liberty incident, and alleged racial crime statistics. A major aspect of the sub was the use of slang and childish diction to spread their messages, such as "nose-fren" and "longnose" for Jews, "bop" for committing violence or genocide, and "Honk honk" as a euphemism for "Heil Hitler". It was banned on June 20, 2019, for glorifying violence, after it has accumulated around 60,346 subscribers. r/Honkler, which hosted similar content, was banned on July 2, 2019.

GenderCritical 

The subreddit r/GenderCritical had 64,400 users, self-described as "reddit's most active feminist community" for "women-centred, radical feminists" to discuss "gender from a gender-critical perspective". Described by Jillian York of the Electronic Frontier Foundation as "a subreddit where transphobic commentary has thrived", the subreddit frequently hosted posts asserting that transgender women are not women. On June 29, 2020, the subreddit was "banned for violating Reddit's rule against promoting hate". After r/GenderCritical was banned, several of its users migrated to Ovarit, a trans-exclusionary radical feminism-centered website similar to Reddit.

GunsForSale 

In January 2014, Mother Jones published a story describing the sale of guns on the site. The report suggested that sellers were doing so to exploit a loophole in U.S. federal law. Nearly 100 AR-15s were engraved with the Reddit logo as part of a licensing deal made with the page in 2011. It was banned on March 21, 2018, after Reddit updated its content policies to forbid subreddits facilitating transactions involving certain goods and services.

Incels 

A subreddit founded for "involuntary celibates", r/incels, was a forum wherein members discussed their lack of romantic success. The definition of an incel on the subreddit was someone who has unintentionally gone at least six months without a romantic partner and is at least 21 years old; self-described incels are largely heterosexual men. Many members adhered to the "black pill" ideology, which espoused despondency often coupled with misogynistic views that condoned, downplayed, or advocated rape, while referring to women as "femoids" or "foids", "cunts", "cum dumpsters", and "sluts". Notable black pill posts included "reasons why women are the embodiment of evil" and "proof that girls are nothing but trash that use men". Users deemed too female-friendly, or who claimed that women experienced inceldom to the same extent as men, were banned. The subreddit's users intermittently either revered or hated "normies" and "Chads" for their courtship abilities, and some admire murderers such as Elliot Rodger, perpetrator of the 2014 Isla Vista killings, who identified as an "incel".

In the summer of 2017, a petition on Change.org called for r/incels to be banned for inciting violence against women. Following the October implementation of a new Reddit policy that prohibited the incitement of violence, the subreddit was banned on November 7, 2017. At the time of its banning, r/incels had around 40,000 subscribers.

r/Braincels subsequently became the most popular subreddit for incels, gaining 16,900 followers by April 2018. The subreddit's leaders disavowed the Toronto van attack and deleted some posts by members who praised Alek Minassian's alleged actions. In September 2018, the subreddit was quarantined, and in October, it was banned.

Jailbait 

Reddit's staff was initially opposed to the addition of obscene material to the site, but they eventually became more lenient when prolific moderators, such as a user named u/violentacrez, proved capable of identifying and removing illegal content at a time when they were not sufficiently staffed to take on the task. Communities devoted to explicit material saw rising popularity, and r/jailbait, which featured provocative shots of underage teenagers, became the chosen "subreddit of the year" in the "Best of reddit" user poll in 2008, and at one point, making "jailbait" the second most common search term for the site. Erik Martin, general manager of Reddit, defended the subreddit by saying that such controversial pages were a consequence of allowing free speech on the site.

r/jailbait came to wider attention outside Reddit when Anderson Cooper of CNN devoted a segment of his program to condemning the subreddit and criticizing Reddit for hosting it. Initially, this caused a spike in Internet traffic to the subreddit, causing the page to peak at 1.73 million views on the day of the report. In the wake of these news reports, a Reddit user posted an image of an underage girl to r/jailbait, subsequently claiming to have nude images of her as well. Dozens of Reddit users then posted requests for these nude photos to be shared to them via private message. Other Reddit users drew attention to this discussion, and the r/jailbait forum was subsequently closed by Reddit administrators on October 11, 2011. Critics, such as r/jailbait's creator, disputed claims that this thread was the basis of the decision, instead claiming it was an excuse to close down a controversial subreddit due to recent negative media coverage. Others claimed that the thread believed to have prompted the closure was created by members of the Something Awful forum in an attempt to get the section shut down, rather than the regulars of the forum.

Following the closure of r/jailbait, The Daily Dot declared the community's creator, u/violentacrez, "The Most Important Person on Reddit in 2011", calling the r/jailbait controversy "the first major challenge to the site's voluntary doctrine of absolute free speech".

Jakolandia 

In January 2019, a Philippine-based subreddit, r/jakolandia, was accused of "distributing" posts of photos of women, including celebrities, apparently without their consent, similar to "a number" of secret Facebook groups that had been engaging in illegal activity of sharing "obscene" photos of women and possibly child pornography. r/jakolandia was later banned as a result.

MGTOW 

r/MGTOW was a subreddit for Men Going Their Own Way, an anti-feminist, misogynistic, mostly online community advocating for men to separate themselves from women and from a society which they believe has been corrupted by feminism. In January 2020, a group of researchers published a preprint of an analysis of the manosphere, which listed r/MGTOW among a group of growing online communities which the authors said were involved in "online harassment and real-world violence". Reddit quarantined the subreddit shortly afterward. In August 2021, Reddit banned the subreddit for violating its policies prohibiting content that "incites violence or promotes hate based on identity or vulnerability".

MillionDollarExtreme 

r/MillionDollarExtreme was a subreddit dedicated to the comedy group Million Dollar Extreme, who were accused of having connections with the alt-right.  Its users heavily promoted racist, homophobic, and transphobic content, and propagated various anti-Semitic conspiracy theories. It was banned on September 10, 2018, for violating Reddit's content policy regarding violent content, when it had around 43,000 subscribers. Million Dollar Extreme's YouTube channel and Instagram account were already terminated earlier in the year.  Associated subreddits r/BillionShekelSupreme, r/milliondollarextreme2, r/ChadRight, and several others were subsequently banned.

NoNewNormal 

r/NoNewNormal was a subreddit that claimed to be critical of the responses to the COVID-19 pandemic, and has propagated various conspiracies about the pandemic, such as lockdown, mask, and vaccine denialism. It was quarantined for misinformation on August 12, 2021, when it had accumulated over 112,000 subscribers. Subreddits r/rejectnewnormal and r/refusenewnormal were subsequently banned for trying to circumvent the quarantine, and r/PandemicHoax and r/truthseekers, which hosted similar content, set themselves to private.

A thread posted by a user on r/vaxxhappened, a community against vaccine misinformation, called upon Reddit admins to ban subreddits primarily spreading medical misinformation. Reddit admins responded by saying that Reddit is a platform for free speech and discussion, and would continue to allow subreddits that challenge the consensus views on the pandemic.

On September 1, 2021, Reddit banned the subreddit for brigading subreddits that criticized it, along with quarantining 54 other subreddits associated with COVID-19 denial.

Physical_Removal 

r/Physical_Removal was banned on August 15, 2017, for inciting violence. The subreddit's name stems from a quote by right-wing libertarian philosopher Hans-Hermann Hoppe, who wrote: "There can be no tolerance toward democrats and communists in a libertarian social order. They will have to be physically separated and removed from society" (referring to ostracism), and, by extension, their advocacy for forced deportation or physical removal of political leftists from the United States. It was controversial for its promotion of violence against leftists and other groups. For instance, users would make reference to throwing people from helicopters, an execution method used by Augusto Pinochet. Physical_Removal attracted further attention in 2017 after the Unite the Right rally in Charlottesville, Virginia, due to mockery of the death of Heather Heyer, who was struck and killed by a car driven by a far-right terrorist at the rally.

Pizzagate 

"Pizzagate" is a conspiracy theory that emerged from social media and fake news websites in early November 2016, which falsely alleged the existence of a child trafficking ring that involved officials in the Democratic Party and restaurants such as Comet Ping Pong. The r/pizzagate subreddit, which spun off from r/The_Donald, was dedicated to discussing this conspiracy theory, and had over 20,000 subscribers. This subreddit was banned on November 23, 2016, for violating Reddit's policy against doxing, as users would post the personal details of people allegedly connected to this conspiracy.

QAnon-related subs 

Reddit attracted attention from mainstream publications in 2018 due to its role in helping spread the QAnon conspiracy theory from 4chan and 8chan to the wider internet, with tens of thousands of users subscribing to various subreddits promoting it at its peak. In response, Reddit began to ban these subreddits for breaking sitewide rules. In March 2018, the original QAnon sub r/CBTS_stream, standing for "Calm before the storm", was banned for inciting violence and sharing confidential personal information after accumulating over 20,000 subscribers. r/GreatAwakening, which had a more active userbase with over 71,000 subscribers and an average of 10,000 comments per day, was banned in September that year for repeated content violations, such as harassing a user they misidentified as the suspect of the Jacksonville Landing shooting. Around 17 other subreddits, such as r/BiblicalQ, r/Quincels, and backup sub r/The_GreatAwakening, were also banned. These bans resulted in a significant decrease in QAnon-related discussions on Reddit by 2020, with the remaining ones being criticisms against the conspiracy theory.

SanctionedSuicide 

r/SanctionedSuicide was a subreddit that approached the topic of suicide from a pro-choice perspective. It included both discussions surrounding the ethics of suicide, and posts containing rants from Reddit users. The subreddit was banned on March 14, 2018, for violating its guidelines, prompting the creation of the web forum Sanctioned Suicide.

SonyGOP 

On December 15, 2014, Reddit took the unusual step of banning a subreddit, r/SonyGOP,  which was being used to distribute hacked Sony files.

Shoplifting 

The subreddit r/Shoplifting was devoted to stories, tips, and questions for the purpose of shoplifting at large commercial retail chains. It dissuaded people from shoplifting from smaller stores which were presumed to suffer greater losses from theft. It also heavily featured pictures displaying items that its users had supposedly "lifted". Near the end of its existence, over 77,000 people were subscribed to the subreddit. It was banned on March 21, 2018, due to violating an amendment to the Reddit User Agreement added that same day which states: "Users may not use Reddit to solicit or facilitate any transaction or gift involving certain goods and services, including: ... Stolen goods".

The_Donald 

The subreddit r/The_Donald, which was intended for supporters of US president Donald Trump, was originally created for his 2016 presidential campaign. Due to harassment of Reddit administrators and manipulation of the site's algorithms to push content to Reddit's front page using the "sticky" feature of subreddits, Reddit banned many of the sub's users who were described as "toxic". This occurred after Reddit's CEO Steve Huffman (known as u/spez on Reddit) admitted to silently editing comments attacking him made by the community's users. This caused the term "spez" to be used instead of "edit" in The_Donald's terminology. Reddit modified the site's algorithms to specifically prevent the sub's moderators from gaming the algorithms to artificially push the sub's content to Reddit's front page. Additionally, Reddit introduced a filtering feature which allowed individual users to block content from any sub. While this feature was being worked on prior to the problems r/The_Donald were causing, it was suggested that it was introduced specifically to allow users to block them. Huffman referred to r/The_Donald's users' complaints of harassment "hypocritical", due to their harassment of others.

After the Christchurch mosque shootings in 2019, many posts appeared in the subreddit arguing that the shootings were justified, filled with anti-Muslim hate.

The subreddit was quarantined by Reddit admins in June 2019 for "threats of violence against police and public officials".

On June 29, 2020, Reddit banned the subreddit for frequent rule-breaking, for antagonizing the company and other communities and for failing to "meet our most basic expectations".

TheFappening 

In August 2014, Reddit users began sharing a large number of naked pictures of celebrities stolen, using phishing, from their private Apple iCloud accounts. A subreddit, r/TheFappening, was created as a hub to share and discuss these stolen photos; the situation was called "CelebGate" by the media. The subreddit contained most of the images. Victims of "The Fappening" included high-profile names such as Jennifer Lawrence, Kate Upton and Mary Elizabeth Winstead. Some of the images may have constituted child pornography, as the photos of Liz Lee and McKayla Maroney from the leak were claimed to have been taken when the women were underage, though this remains controversial. The subreddit was closed by Reddit administrators in September 2014. The scandal led to wider criticisms concerning the website's moderation from The Verge and The Daily Dot.

TruFemcels 

In January 2021, Reddit banned r/TruFemcels, a subreddit for female incels ("femcels") for promoting hate. It was previously accused of lookism, racism, transphobia, and spreading alt-right conspiracy theories, and for using the same terminology of incels. After the ban, the community migrated to a dedicated website, ThePinkPill.co.

UncensoredNews

r/UncensoredNews was a far-right subreddit that claimed to be the "free speech" alternative to the more popular news-related subs. Founded by users who moderated several white nationalist subreddits before June 2016, it saw a massive increase in subscribers following the Orlando nightclub shooting, as the moderators of r/news were accused of censoring the name, religion, and motive of perpetrator Omar Mateen. r/UncensoredNews primarily promoted stories about crimes committed by minorities or left-wing people, such as attacks on white farmers in South Africa, with a xenophobic, Islamophobic, and racist bent. For example, a post stickied by one of the sub's moderators was titled "Here at uncensored news we love racism, bigotry, misogyny, hatred, xenophobia, transphobia, homo phobia [sic] etc." while another user compared miscegenation to bestiality. r/UncensoredNews and its moderators were banned on March 12, 2018 for inciting violence, possibly in response to a thread on whether Jews or Muslims were considered more dangerous.

WatchPeopleDie and Gore 
After the 2019 Christchurch mosque shootings, Reddit banned the subreddit r/WatchPeopleDie, which was dedicated to uploading media depicting real-life deaths of people, such as workplace accidents, vehicular manslaughter, gun violence, suicides, and various forms of homicide, after it disseminated links to video of the shooting. The similar subreddit r/Gore was banned at the same time, as was r/WPDTalk, a subreddit for discussion on what went on in r/WatchPeopleDie. Although previously quarantined for over half a year, the subreddit was completely banned at approximately 17:09 UTC on March 15, 2019, less than a day after the events for violating Reddit's content policy, specifically the policy against "glorifying or encouraging violence." Moderators of the subreddit had initially allowed the video to be shared.

Active subreddits

Antiwork 

The subreddit r/antiwork was established in 2013. A longtime moderator stated that the subreddit was intended to be for people advocating for a society in which people did not have to work at all, or at least had a much smaller obligation to work. During the COVID-19 pandemic, new posters who were unhappy with working conditions joined.

In 2019, the number of subscribers was 13,000, which increased to 100,000 in early 2020. The subreddit's popularity increased after people began posting text messages of employees giving notice to their employers that they no longer wanted their jobs. In November 2021, the subscriber number exceeded one million. By December 2021, that number had grown to 1.4 million, and in January 2022, it had reached over 1.7 million. On 26 January, r/antiwork was the subreddit with the highest increase of traffic that was not one of Reddit's "default" front page subreddits.

In January 2022, a longtime moderator agreed to be interviewed by Fox News host Jesse Watters. The Independent stated that Watters "was openly contemptuous about the movement". In response, members of the subreddit criticized the moderator, and the other moderators in turn temporarily made the subreddit private. Ultimately, the interviewee was asked to give up her moderation duties. Noah Berlatsky, writing for The Independent, stated that the Fox News segment became "a publicity disaster for r/antiwork", and that r/antiwork became "widely ridiculed".

Following this "publicity disaster" a similar subreddit, r/workreform, was formed around similar ideas/content as r/antiwork.

aznidentity and AsianMasculinity 

r/aznidentity and r/AsianMasculinity, are communities operated by and for Asian-American men, and discuss various topics related to lifestyle, dating, fitness, and world events from the perspective of the male Asian diaspora. Users often focus on the emasculation of Asian men sexually in American culture, and claim that Asian-American women in interracial relationships often play a role in actively perpetuating this. In certain areas, users of r/aznidentity are sometimes referred to as "Men's Rights Asians" or "MRAsians", a pun on "men's rights activists". Additionally, r/aznidentity users also claim that mainstream and social media coverage of racism against black communities, particularly when done by Asian-Americans, are done at the detriment of Asian causes, and claim that Black people are over-represented in hate crimes against Asians. Certain Asian-American women on social media have accused users of harassment, with author Celeste Ng having written an article about her experience and the experiences of other Asian-American women in The Cut.

BlackPeopleTwitter 

On April 1, 2019, r/BlackPeopleTwitter began requiring users to prove they were black—by sending a photo with their forearm and their Reddit username—before allowing them to post comments. The moderators described this action as an April Fools' Day prank, albeit one with a "very real reason." The April Fools' prank lasted only a few days, but the moderators now limit some contentious threads to a "country club" consisting of verified people of color and white people who complete an application process including writing "about what white privilege means to them." Additionally, verified black commenters (but not other people of color) receive a check mark next to their username.

FemaleDatingStrategy 

r/FemaleDatingStrategy (FDS) was created in 2019. It has been accused by r/AgainstHateSubreddits of promoting homophobia, transphobia, misandry, and discrimination against sex workers. The Verge described the advice given to women as socially and sexually conservative and oppressive to women. FDS posters must follow strict rules to avoid being banned, with support for consensual BDSM, pornography consumption, or casual sex being bannable offenses. As of August 2021, it had about 179,000 members who were described as mostly heterosexual women.

The group has a strict hierarchy, with moderators called "Ruthless Strategists" on top. Community is prioritized over the individual, and members are advised against speaking with journalists, practices which have been described as cult-like. The subreddit advises against dating men with mental illnesses, and has banned members for believing men can be victims of sexual assault. The members oppose liberal feminism, or "libfems", and endorse TERF-like views, with transgender women being entirely banned from posting. It has also been criticized for contradictory advice, such as encouraging independence from men, while expecting men to pay for dates, and be the primary breadwinner of the household.

Though it was founded in opposition to manosphere subreddits, FDS critics have compared it to them. A co-host for the subreddit's podcast was quoted by The Guardian responding to this comparison by stating that, "[FDS] isn't about trying to manipulate men into trying to behave a certain way ... it's more about finding a man who is comfortable with you having boundaries and standards, and who understands how to treat a woman."

The subreddit has made extensive use of female-incel (aka femcel) language, but this was phased out in favor of new terminology, as the femcel jargon interfered with the recruitment of new members. The new terminology includes terms like "scrotes" for men, and "pickmeisha" for women who FDS claims degrade themselves for men. "Pickmeisha" has been used to label members that criticize the moderators or claim to enjoy banned behavior such as casual sex, and it has been targeted at women in other subreddits for issues such as seeking advice on their partner's erectile dysfunction.

GenZedong 

A Time report identified r/GenZedong, a self-described "Dengist" subreddit focused on China, as a haven for anti-Uyghur racism and Uyghur genocide denialism. The subreddit was quarantined on 23 March 2022 for spreading disinformation about the Russian invasion of Ukraine. At the time of its quarantine, the subreddit had over 57,000 subscribers. It previously received attention when the hacker group Anonymous uploaded a meme mocking the sub to the server hosting Chinese government websites, following their hack of a government site promoting tourism in China.

HermanCainAward 

r/HermanCainAward is a subreddit that awards people who have "made public declaration of their anti-mask, anti-vax, or COVID-hoax views" who later die from COVID-19 or COVID-19 complications with the "Herman Cain Freedom Award". People who have "made public declaration of their anti-mask, anti-vax, or Covid-hoax views" who are later hospitalized with COVID-19 are nominated for the award.

According to Le Monde, "In its early days, HCA was primarily fueled by articles found in the press", but that, "in recent months, the examples have been drawn directly from a Facebook page of COVID-19 victims. Publication after publication, the pattern invariably repeats itself: one person (anonymized to respect Reddit rules) says all the bad things they think about vaccines, masks, or sometimes even doubts the existence of the pandemic. Often the memes (humorous diversions) used to illustrate mistrust of the vaccine are the same. The following screenshot tells us that the person has just fallen ill, and sometimes that the illness does not really give them a break. Calls to pray for help may follow, before a loved one finally announces the death."

F. Diane Bart, a psychotherapist writing for NBC News, described the subreddit as "a dark and sardonic corner of the internet" that "captures the rage and outrage of presumably vaccinated, mask-wearing individuals, many of whom have either been infected with COVID-19 in the past or have watched friends and family become ill—and even die."

KotakuInAction 

r/KotakuInAction was one of the main online hubs for participants of the misogynistic harassment campaign known as Gamergate. Users are warned that by joining KotakuInAction, they will be banned from other subreddits such as r/OffMyChest (a subreddit based around expressing opinions, as well as confessing personal thoughts), r/NaturalHair, and r/Rape, the latter of the three being a support forum for survivors of rape that had been targeted for brigading by r/KotakuInAction users.

BuzzFeeds Joseph Bernstein reported that many of KotakuInAction's moderators also moderate other subreddits "devoted to either the physical and emotional degradation and humiliation of women, or in subreddits devoted to mocking and delegitimizing the arguments and appearances of feminists and 'social justice warriors'."

In 2016, KotakuInAction became the subject of an academic study done by three members of the Georgia Institute of Technology.

On July 12, 2018, the creator and head moderator of KotakuInAction removed all of the moderators and set the forum to private, alleging that it had become "infested with racism and sexism". A Reddit employee restored the forum and its moderators an hour later.

A 2020 review analyzing ten discussion boards on KotakuInAction suggested a connection between Gamergate and right-wing extremism (RWE), finding that the three main themes in these discussion boards were "RWE bigotry", "always anti-left" and "hate speech is free speech".

MensRights 

The antifeminist subreddit r/MensRights was created in 2008. It has over 300,000 subscribers .
Media studies researcher Debbie Ging cites the "extreme misogyny and proclivity for personal attacks" of several men's rights subreddits, including r/MensRights, as "the most striking features of the new antifeminist politics".

SPLC listing 

r/MensRights was included in a list of 12 websites in the spring 2012 issue ("The Year in Hate and Extremism") of the Southern Poverty Law Center's (SPLC) Intelligence Report in a section called "Misogyny: The Sites". The SPLC reported that, "although some of the sites make an attempt at civility and try to back their arguments with facts, they are almost all thick with misogynistic attacks that can be astounding for the guttural hatred they express".

More specific claims were made about r/MensRights in particular, saying that it showed anger "toward any program designed to help women", and that the subreddit "trafficks in various conspiracy theories", using a moderator's statements as an example of this behavior. Kyle Bachan at The Huffington Post interpreted the report as saying the subreddit was a hate group.

In late March 2012, Mark Potok (the Intelligence Reports editor) was asked in an interview if the SPLC had formally classified r/MensRights as a hate group. His response was that, "we wrote about the subreddit Mens Rights, but we did not list it as a hate group", and expressed doubt that the SPLC would ever designate the community as a hate group, noting that, "it's a diverse group, which certainly does include some misogynists—but I don't think that's [its basic] purpose".

Later that year, the SPLC published a statement about the reactions to their report, saying it, "provoked a tremendous response among men's rights activists (MRAs) and their sympathizers", and, "it should be mentioned that the SPLC did not label MRAs as members of a hate movement; nor did our article claim that the grievances they air on their websites – false rape accusations, ruinous divorce settlements and the like – are all without merit. But we did call out specific examples of misogyny and the threat, overt or implicit, of violence."

Doxing incident 

In April 2013, the subreddit was threatened with a shutdown by Reddit admins after r/MensRights subscribers gathered personal information on a supposed blogger of feminist issues, and the subreddit's moderators advised members of the subreddit on how to proceed with this 'doxing' without running afoul of site rules. Later on, it was discovered that they had identified the wrong woman, and it has been reported that many death threats had been sent to her school and employment. Georgetown University confirmed that she was not the same person as the blog's author after receiving threatening messages.

Rape report spam 

In mid-December 2013, users from r/MensRights, as well as 4chan, spammed the Occidental College Online Rape Report Form with hundreds of false rape reports, following a user's complaint that the form was vulnerable to abuse as a result of the submitter's ability to remain anonymous. Around 400 false rape accusations were made by men's rights activists against members of the college, feminists, and fictional people.

NoFap 

r/NoFap is a subreddit dedicated to supporting those who wish to give up pornography or masturbation.

Some journalists have claimed that NoFap's forums were filled with misogyny, stating that "there is a darker side to NoFap. Among the reams of Reddit discussions and YouTube videos, a 'fundamentally misogynistic rhetoric' regularly emerges", that the subreddit idolizes testosterone and inherently masculine qualities, and that "the NoFap community has become linked to wider sexism and misogyny, reducing women to sexual objects to be attained or abstained from, and shaming sexually active women."

Piracy and PiratedGames 

In 2019, r/piracy was threatened with a ban after receiving dozens of DMCA takedown notices. The moderators said that Reddit did not investigate the infringement claims to find if they actually infringed copyright law; often they related to content like sharing the URL to a streaming site, asking if such sites were working, and posting guides to install programs. Users of the subreddit voted to delete all content older than six months, as it was not feasible to investigate all past content.

r/PiratedGames, whose discussions focused specifically on pirated video games, was banned on 17 August 2022 for excessive DMCA claims, even though the subreddit explicitly banned sharing pirated content. With over 300,000 subscribers, it was among the largest piracy-related subreddits. It was restored the next day following an appeal from the moderators. TorrentFreak in separate articles said the ban was part of Reddit's increasing crackdown on copyright infringement, noting that the year prior around 2,625 subreddits had been banned for similar reasons, and that DMCA takedowns on Reddit had increased by over 15,000% in the past five years.

Portugueses 

The subreddit r/Portugueses is often home to Portuguese nationalist and nativist rhetoric. It also contains racism, homophobia, sexism, and other Reddit-policy violations. Moderators and volunteer moderators of other subreddits who remove or report hate speech and other policy violations coming from r/Portugueses are often threatened for doing so.

Russia 

r/Russia, the national subreddit for Russia, was quarantined on 1 March 2022, and the site's administrators removed one of the moderators, for spreading disinformation about the Russian invasion of Ukraine. Among the disinformation promoted by the sub's moderators were claims that the Ukrainian military was controlled by Nazis, that Ukraine was using human shields to raise the conflict's death toll, and that the Ukrainian leadership was refusing calls for peace negotiations. The sub had over 265,000 subscribers prior to the quarantine. The sister sub, r/RussiaPolitics, was also quarantined for similar reasons.

Technology 

In April 2014, it was made apparent that moderators of r/technology, a subreddit with 5 million subscribers, were using automatic filters to remove submissions that contained certain keywords, such as "Aaron Swartz", "Tesla", "Comcast", "NSA", and "Snowden". This ultimately led to community protests, claims of censorship from users, and r/technology losing its default subreddit status.

TheRedPill 

Alluding to the symbol of the "red pill" from the film The Matrix, r/TheRedPill is devoted to discussions of male sexual strategy in which participants are ranked as "alpha" or "beta" males. The subreddit promotes antifeminism, rape culture, hegemonic masculinity, and traditional gender roles. Users discuss diet and physical fitness alongside "pick-up" techniques for seducing women, while also displaying different levels of misogyny ranging from virulent hatred of women to simple frustration with contemporary male experience. The Southern Poverty Law Center describes it as one of several male supremacist subreddits featuring xenophobic discourse. It has been associated with several right-wing movements and the alt-right because of its attacks on feminism and mockery of rape.

In 2017, it was revealed that New Hampshire legislator Robert Fisher created the subreddit and posted demeaning comments about women. After this discovery, he resigned from office. The New Statesman has described this subreddit as one of the most misogynistic subreddits on Reddit, which aims to radicalize men. , the subreddit is quarantined.

Free speech rationale 

In accordance with its policies at the time on free speech, Reddit's admins stated in 2013 that they did not ban communities solely for featuring controversial content. Reddit's general manager Erik Martin noted that "having to stomach occasional troll [sub]reddits like r/picsofdeadkids or morally questionable [sub]reddits like r/jailbait are part of the price of free speech on a site like this," and that it is not Reddit's place to censor its users. The site's former CEO, Yishan Wong, stated that distasteful subreddits would not be banned because Reddit as a platform should serve the ideals of free speech.  Critics of Reddit's position argued at the time that it had not been consistent in following its free speech philosophy.  In a 2015 discussion on the site's content policy, founder Steve Huffman stated that "neither Alexis [Ohanian] nor I created Reddit to be a bastion of free speech".

With the banning of r/The Donald, Reddit expanded the kinds of content that was banned on the site, implementing new rules that directly prohibit hate speech. In 2021, Reddit stated that they allowed conversations that "question or disagree with popular consensus" regarding the COVID-19 pandemic, stating that "dissent is a part of Reddit and the foundation of democracy" despite criticism by site moderators. Although it banned r/NoNewNormal after moderator protests, this was for unduly influencing other communities, not the subreddit's content.

References

Works cited 

 
 

Internet-related controversies
Internet ethics
Internet vigilantism
Internet privacy
Online obscenity controversies
Social bookmarking
News aggregators
Political websites
Child pornography websites
Violence against women
21st-century controversies
Controversial
Alt-right Internet forums
Cyberbullying